This is a list of famous Belarusian musicians and singers:

 Dreamlin
 KRIWI
 N.R.M.
 Parason
 Reido
 Kraski
 Stary Olsa
 Litesound
 Molchat Doma

See also
 List of Belarusians
 Lists of musicians

Belarusian